Adel Ben-Bechir Chedli (born 16 September 1976) is a former professional footballer who played as a midfielder. Born in France, he represented Tunisia at international level.

Club career
Born in La Ricamarie, Loire, France, Chedli joined the Manchester United academy in 1995. After one year at the club he earned his only first team experience in a closed doors friendly against Celtic. He went on to join AS Saint-Étienne and broke into the first team in 1996. In 1997, he was transferred to FC Sochaux for whom he played several years in the Ligue 1. It was during that time that also earned his first cap for the Tunisian national team. Before his move to Germany Chedli played for FC Istres. He left the club on a free transfer after they had been relegated to Ligue 2 after playing in 88 games.

At Nürnberg, Chedli had a rough first year and a hard time breaking into the first squad, at the end of the season he had played in only six Bundesliga matches and was at times demoted to the club's Bayernliga reserve team. His situation did not improve when Chedli was sent off twice in a short span, once with the reserves and once in friendly against the Kansas City Wizards. After the latter incident in which Chedli had kicked a Wizards player in the shins, he left the field cursing at Nürnberg first team coach Hans Meyer, an event that the Nürnberg press interpreted as insubordination and predicted an early release of the left midfielder whose contract with Nürnberg would have run until 2007. That prediction became true in July 2006, when player and team agreed on a termination of the contract.

International career
A French youth international, he made his debut for his native Tunisian side on 26 May 1996, a friendly match against Senegal. Due to nationality transfer was not allowed until the 2000s, he's entered the team again and been a regular with the Tunisian national team since 2003 and won the 2004 African Nations' Cup with the "Carthage Eagles". He was also a member of the Tunisian Confederations Cup team in 2005 and was a member of the squad at the 2006 World cup.

Honours
Tunisia
 Africa Cup of Nations: 2004

References

External links
 
 
 
 Adel Chedli at Footballdatabase

Living people
1976 births
Footballers from Auvergne-Rhône-Alpes
Sportspeople from Loire (department)
Association football midfielders
French sportspeople of Tunisian descent
Citizens of Tunisia through descent
Tunisian footballers
Tunisian expatriate footballers
2005 FIFA Confederations Cup players
2006 FIFA World Cup players
FC Istres players
FC Sochaux-Montbéliard players
AS Saint-Étienne players
1. FC Nürnberg players
FC Sion players
Étoile Sportive du Sahel players
Raja CA players
Al-Shaab CSC players
Tunisia international footballers
Bundesliga players
Ligue 1 players
Ligue 2 players
2004 African Cup of Nations players
2006 Africa Cup of Nations players
2011 African Nations Championship players
2012 Africa Cup of Nations players
UAE Pro League players
French footballers
Tunisia A' international footballers